The Cross Harbour ferry service, officially known as F4 Cross Harbour, was a commuter ferry service in Sydney, New South Wales. Part of the Sydney Ferries network, it was operated by Transdev Sydney Ferries and serviced the Darling Harbour, Lavender Bay, Rose Bay, and Watsons Bay areas.

Introduced on 26 November 2017, the service replaced the entirety of the predecessor F4 Darling Harbour service and the Watsons Bay stopping pattern of the F7 Eastern Suburbs service. Emerald-class ferries and SuperCat ferries operated the service. On 25 October 2020, the service ceased operations and was split up into F4 Pyrmont Bay and F9 Watsons Bay services.

History
Prior to the introduction of the Cross Harbour route, service patterns on the Sydney Ferries network were often divided between wharves located west of Circular Quay, and wharves located east, with the exception of a short-lived service in the mid-1990s that linked McMahons Point and Rose Bay. The Cross Harbour service is a successor to the Darling Harbour ferry service, which existed in many iterations between the 1980s and 2017. The new service was unveiled by the New South Wales Government on 27 March 2017.

Following community consultation jointly held by the ferry operator Transdev Sydney Ferries and Transport for NSW in 2019–2020, the F4 route was divided into F4 Pyrmont Bay and F9  Watsons Bay services on 25 October 2020.

Wharves
[
{
  "type": "ExternalData",
  "service": "page",
  "title": "Rose Bay & Watsons Bay ferry wharves.map"
},
{
  "type": "ExternalData",
  "service": "page",
  "title": "Circular Quay ferry wharf.map"
},
{
  "type": "ExternalData",
  "service": "page",
  "title": "F3 & F4 shared wharves.map"
},
{
  "type": "ExternalData",
  "service": "page",
  "title": "Pyrmont Bay ferry wharf.map"
}
]

Patronage
The following table shows the patronage of Sydney Ferries network for the year ending 30 June 2020.

References
Notes

Citations

External links
F4 Cross Harbour timetable between 1 January 2019 and cessaion at Transport for NSW

Ferry transport in Sydney